Entomacrodus vermiculatus, the vermiculated blenny, is a species of combtooth blenny native to the Indian Ocean where it is found around the Seychelles, the Maldives and Christmas Island. It is largely an inhabitant of the intertidal zone where it is regularly exposed to the air which it is capable of breathing.  This species reaches a length of  TL.

References

vermiculatus
Fish described in 2005